Class analysis is research in sociology, politics and economics from the point of view of the stratification of the society into dynamic classes. It implies that there is no universal or uniform social outlook, rather that there are fundamental conflicts that exist inherent to how society is currently organized.

Most known examples are the theory of Karl Marx and Max Weber's three-component theory of stratification.

Barrington Moore and political development
In a non-Marxist sense, class analysis is a theory of political development, in which political regimes and systems are said to be shaped by the social class structure of the country. The main advocate for this theory is political scientist Barrington Moore Jr. In Moore's theory, Great Britain gradually attained a stable democratic governance, compared to neighboring countries such as France and Germany, due to the rapid displacement of peasantry during the enclosure movement which fully transformed Britain into an advanced, industrial society with a strong bourgeois class, which Moore sees as indispensable for a lasting liberal democracy. In contrast, France had a large peasantry that is stationary on land yet politically volatile, leading to the alternating between violent revolutions and monarchical reactions.

Class size
Sociologist Erik Olin Wright splits class analysis into a macro and micro level. The foundation of class analysis on a macro level can be identified with class structure. Examples of such class structure in a macro level can be analyzed within a firm, city, country, or the entire world. On a micro level, class analysis focuses on the effects that the class may have on an individual. Erik Olin Wright exclaims examples of this to be: "Analyses of labor market strategies of unskilled workers, or the effects of technological change on class consciousness, or political contributions of corporate executives". Macro and Micro level events can correlate with one another through different perspectives. Wright proclaims that macro level events are not created and set on one large effect, but instead processed through multiple individuals in a very intricate and complex pattern. He dictates that Macro class size events are endorsed by an embodiment of multiple micro class events. He also states the opposite effect each size has on each other and how Micro level events relative to class relations can be reinforced by the context of macro level events.

Neo-Weberian definition

According to Richard Breen, Weber first begins to describe class analysis with the class situation of the capital market an individual lives in. He proclaims that members of the same social class share the same life chances They also develop under the same market which procures chances and limits according to the resources the individual and/or class provides to it. He also states that the individuals who understand the broad range of options a chance may give them, may also be given more opportunities by the market or be willing to share among the individuals respected  class. Breen debriefs Weber's classification of social and how Weber classifies these classes not only through a social filter but by a grander economic one as well. He also makes note that social and economic mobility are a great key to the understanding class analysis. Here he dictates that although it is easier and more fluid to traverse through the social class, it is much more difficult to progress through the economic class, and a great limiter is a social class the individual is located in. These results in limited chances by the market and is a great factor in why class immobility occurs. Weber defines economic classes according to his time as: "'dominant entrepreneurial and propertied groups'; the petty bourgeoisie; workers with formal credentials (the middle class) and those who lack them and whose only asset is their labor power (the working class)."

Class differentials in educational attainment and their explanation

Sociologist John Goldthorpe explains that while educational attainment in developed countries has risen in the last decades due to endorsements of grants, loans and other social motivations, empirical data substantiates that the differentials in social-economic class still plays a major role in educational and economic attainment. He goes on to explain how people of lower social class tend to stay in the class of their upbringing by choosing to not pursue further educational attainment or the works needed to attain a better social status. Explanations for these phenomena include theories by Halsey and her associates, which state the connection between culture and class, how people of high social class or paramount culture set a more important objective on education compared to parents of lower classes. According to Goldthorpe, a more aggressive approach, as indicated by Bourdieu and Passeron, indicates that the educational system functions as a social control, in which dominant class enforce that schools run in a conservative manner and exploit the inequalities that come with every child due to their family's class background. This will ensure subjects of lower class status to accept failure or indulge in counter-school subcultures. Goldthorpe, however, states that in the last century there has truly been extensive opportunities for upward educational and class mobility defended by means of empirical data.

Other theories proposed by different sociologists arise as well. One view claimed by Keller and Zavalloni indicate that to better understand these trends, sociologists must study the aspirations of an individual on a relative level according to their social level and situation and not conclude absolute ideals of aspirations to all the classes, which would be easier to work with. Goldthorpe also acknowledges Boudon's two-effect view in educational attainment. Those stand as the primary effects, which exist as the creation of class differentials in initial achievement, and second effects that affect children when they transition in the educational system. They both work hand in hand were although initial achievement might pursue an individual as they develop in the educational system (Primary), choosing whether to transition into the next level in the system might still be influenced by their class origins (second). Goldthorpe goes on to encourage researchers to enforce further attention to the second effect, because as we progress, even today, the limitations of the primary effects seem to be vanishing as more educational attainment resources and opportunities are being funneled into all class levels.

Class and political partnership

Goldthorpe describes how class influence on an individual's social situation is diminishing substantially in the world of politics. This evidently described by Sociologist M. Lipset during the latter half of the 20th century were liberal democratic working class advocated for their party to represent their problems In the 1950s but quickly diminished during the 1970s as class relations in political partnership was dissolving. This is particularly important, as some Marxist social groups state this to be the downfall of the working class and class analysis. Another example of this dissolution of political and class partnership is Britain's politics; in how political party conflicts tended to focus more on issues instead of interest of the class community. This in turn creates family-party separation which fuels different political party interest. Heath and his associates have theorized the dissolution of this partnership to be derivative of absolute and relative rates in class voting and social mobility. These theories develop through the class development of Britain during the latter half of the 20th centuries by implication of "trends in patterns of class mobility, in levels of class identification, and in class differences in political attitudes and values". Heath and his colleagues try to argue empirically against theories of Dunleavy and associates who stated that new structural cleavages were becoming the foundations for party support. On top of empirical support against, Goldthorpe explains that fluidity and boundaries are the major point against the theories of Dunleavy and his colleagues.

Class interest

Class interest is the interest one assumes when in a set location inside of class relations. Erik Wright describes such as examples as "range of issues, standards of living, working conditions, level of toil, leisure, material security, and other things". This is imperative information to understand when relating individual actions according to their class location.

Class practices

Class practices are the derived as the actions taken by the individual or group with the objective of their own class interest.

See also
Class conflict
Class consciousness
Marxist analysis

References

External links

Social classes